The Saudi Fourth Division is a football league, the fifth tier of the Saudi Arabian football league system. The competition starts in each Regions of Saudi Arabia, a total of 74 teams compete to decide the 32 places in the final stage. It is supervised by Saudi Arabia Football Federation.

Since 2010, the winner, runner-up, third and fourth placed in each season are promoted to the Saudi Second Division League.

Change the name of the competition
The Football Association Board of Directors created a new league called the Third Division League, consisting of 32 teams, and divided into four regional groups, starting from the next season 2021–2022.
Finally, at the level of local competitions affiliated with the Saudi Football Association, the federation announced the change of the third division to the fourth division league.

Performance by season

Saudi Third Division (1997–2021)

Saudi Fourth Division (2021–present)

List of champions

Notes

References

External links
 Saudi Arabia Football Federation

 
4
Fourth level football leagues in Asia